Terrance "T. J." Campbell (born January 23, 1988) is an American professional basketball player who last played for Afyon Belediye of the Turkish Basketbol Süper Ligi (BSL).

Professional career
In July 2010, he signed with the Melbourne Tigers. In November 2010, he was released by the Melbourne. In February 2011, he signed with TED Ankara Kolejliler for the rest of the season.

In November 2011, he joined the Canton Charge of the NBA D-League for the 2011–12 season.

On August 12, 2012, he signed a one-year deal with JDA Dijon. On June 29, 2013, he re-signed with Dijon for one more season.

On June 9, 2014, he signed with JSF Nanterre. On April 26, 2015, he scored a buzzer-beating lay-up to win the Final of the 2015 EuroChallenge Final 64–65. On July 8, 2015, he re-signed with Nanterre for one more season.

On July 12, 2016, he signed with Socar Petkim of the Turkish Basketball First League.

On July 4, 2017, he signed with Türk Telekom of the Turkish Basketball Super League. Campbell played three seasons for the team, averaging 12.2 points, 2.1 rebounds and 3.5 assists per game in his final season.

On August 6, 2020, he signed with Coosur Real Betis of the Liga ACB.

On August 19, 2021, he has signed with Afyon Belediye of the Turkish Basketbol Süper Ligi (BSL).

References

External links
 RealGM.com profile
 Eurobasket.com profile
 FIBA.com profile

1988 births
Living people
Afyonkarahisar Belediyespor players
American expatriate basketball people in Australia
American expatriate basketball people in France
American expatriate basketball people in Spain
American expatriate basketball people in Turkey
American men's basketball players
Basketball players from Phoenix, Arizona
Canton Charge players
Cholet Basket players
JDA Dijon Basket players
Junior college men's basketball players in the United States
Liga ACB players
Melbourne Tigers players
Nanterre 92 players
Petkim Spor players
Point guards
Portland Pilots men's basketball players
Real Betis Baloncesto players
TED Ankara Kolejliler players
Türk Telekom B.K. players